Otto Redlich (November 4, 1896 – August 14, 1978) was an Austrian physical chemist and chemical engineer who is best known for his development of equations of state like Redlich-Kwong equation. Besides this he had numerous other contributions to science. He won the Haitinger Prize of the Austrian Academy of Sciences in 1932.

Biography
Redlich was born 1896 in Vienna, Austria. He went to school in the Döbling district of Vienna. After finishing school in 1915 he joined the Austrian Hungarian Army and served as artillery officer mainly at the Italian front in World War I. He was wounded and became a prisoner of war in August 1918. He returned to Vienna after the war in 1919. He studied chemistry and received his doctorate in 1922 for work on the equilibrium of nitric acid, nitrous and nitric oxide. Redlich worked for one year in industry and than joined Emil Abel at the University of Vienna. He became lecturer in 1929 and professor in 1937. During this time he developed the Teller-Redlich isotopic product rule. After the Anschluss in March  1938, Austria had become a part of Nazi Germany and with the implementation of the Nuremberg Laws all government employed Jews lost their jobs, including academics. Like many other scientist Redlich tried to leave the Nazi governed Austria.

With the help of the Emergency Committee in Aid of Displaced Foreign Scholars he was able to emigrate to the United States in December 1938. He gave lectures at several universities and met Gilbert N. Lewis and Linus Pauling. Harold Urey helped him to get a position in Washington State College. In 1945 he left the College and started to work in industry, at Shell Development Co. in Emeryville, California. He published his paper on the improvement of the  ideal gas equation in 1949, today known as  the Redlich–Kwong equation of state.
 
In 1962 Redlich retired from Shell and received a position at University of California at Berkeley. He died in California in 1978.

Bibliography

References

Jewish emigrants from Austria to the United States after the Anschluss
Washington State University faculty
Academic staff of the University of Vienna
University of California, Berkeley faculty
Jewish American scientists
Scientists from Vienna
Thermodynamicists
Austrian physical chemists
American physical chemists
1978 deaths
1896 births
Austrian chemical engineers
American chemical engineers
20th-century American engineers
20th-century American Jews